The Book of Sirach or Ecclesiasticus (abbreviated Ecclus.) is a Jewish work, originally in Hebrew, of ethical teachings, from approximately 200 to 175 BCE, written by the Judahite scribe Ben Sira of Jerusalem, on the inspiration of his father Joshua son of Sirach, sometimes called Jesus son of Sirach or Yeshua ben Eliezer ben Sira.

In Egypt, it was translated into Greek by the author's unnamed grandson, who added a prologue. This prologue is generally considered the earliest witness to a canon of the books of the prophets, and thus the date of the text is the subject of intense scrutiny.  The book itself is the largest wisdom book from antiquity to have survived.

Canonical status

Sirach is accepted as part of the canon by Catholics, Eastern Orthodox, and most Oriental Orthodox Christians. The Anglican tradition considers Sirach (which was published with other Greek Jewish books in a separate section of the King James Bible) among the apocryphal books, and reads them "for example of life and instruction of manners; but yet [do] not apply them to establish any doctrine." The Lutheran Churches take a similar position. It was cited in some writings in early Christianity. There are claims that it is cited in the Epistle of James, and also the non-canonical Didache (iv. 5) and Epistle of Barnabas (xix. 9). The Catalogue of Cheltenham, Pope Damasus I, the Councils of Hippo (393) and Third Council of Carthage (397), Pope Innocent I, the second Council of Carthage (419), the Council of Florence (1442) and Augustine all regarded it as canonical, although Jerome, Rufinus of Aquileia and the Council of Laodicea ranked it instead as an ecclesiastical book. The Apostolic Canons (not recognized by the Catholic Church) stated as venerable and sacred the Wisdom of Sirach. Pope Innocent I officially confirmed the canon of the Bible shortly after the Third Council of Carthage. The Catholic Church then reaffirmed Sirach and the other deuterocanonical books in 1546 during the fourth session of the Council of Trent, and attached an excommunication to the denial of their scriptural status.

Sirach is not part of the Jewish canon, once thought to have been established at the hypothetical Council of Jamnia, perhaps due to its late authorship, although it is not clear that the canon was completely closed at the time of Ben Sira. Others have suggested that Ben Sira's self-identification as the author precluded it from attaining canonical status, which was reserved for works that were attributed (or could be attributed) to the prophets, or that it was denied entry to the canon as a rabbinical counter-reaction to its embrace by the nascent Christian community.

Some Jews in the diaspora considered Sirach scripture. For instance, the Greek translation made by Ben Sira's grandson was included in the Septuagint, the 2nd-century BCE Greek version of the Hebrew scriptures used by Diaspora Jews, through which it became part of the Greek canon. The multiplicity of manuscript fragments uncovered in the Cairo Genizah evince its authoritative status among Egyptian Jewry until the Middle Ages.

Because it was excluded from the Jewish canon, Sirach was not counted as being canonical in Churches originating from the Reformation, although some retained the book in an appendix to the Bible called Apocrypha.

Structure
As with other wisdom books, there is no easily recognizable structure in Sirach; in many parts it is difficult to discover a logical progression of thought or to discern the principles of arrangement.  However, a series of six poems about the search for and attainment of wisdom (1:1–10, 4:11–19; 6:18–37; 14:20–15:10; 24:1–33; and 38:24–39:11) divide the book into something resembling chapters, although the divisions are not thematically based. The exceptions are the first two chapters, whose reflections on wisdom and fear of God provide the theological framework for what follows, and the last nine chapters, which function as a sort of climax, first in an extended praise of God's glory as manifested through creation (42:15–43:33) and second in the celebration of the heroes of ancient Israel's history dating back to before the Great Flood through contemporary times (see previous section).

Despite the lack of structure, there are certain themes running through the book which reappear at various points. The New Oxford Annotated Apocrypha identifies ten major recurring topics:

 The Creation: 16:24–17:24; 18:1–14; 33:7–15; 39:12–35; and 42:15–43:33
 Death: 11:26–28; 22:11–12; 38:16–23; and 41:1–13
 Friendship: 6:5–17; 9:10–16; 19:13–17; 22:19–26; 27:16–21; and 36:23–37:15
 Happiness: 25:1–11; 30:14–25; and 40:1–30
 Honor and shame: 4:20–6:4; 10:19–11:6; and 41:14–42:8
 Money matters: 3:30–4:10; 11:7–28; 13:1–14:19; 29:1–28; and 31:1–11
 Sin: 7:1–17; 15:11–20; 16:1–17:32; 18:30–19:3; 21:1–10; 22:27–23:27; and 26:28–28:7
 Social justice: 4:1–10; 34:21–27; and 35:14–26
 Speech: 5:6, 9–15; 18:15–29; 19:4–17; 20:1–31; 23:7–15; 27:4–7, 11–15; and 28:8–26
 Women: (9:1–9; 23:22–27; 25:13–26:27; 36:26–31; and 42:9–14.

Contents

The Wisdom of Sirach is a collection of ethical teachings. Thus Sirach, sometimes called Ecclesiasticus, closely resembles Proverbs, except that, unlike the latter, it is presented as the work of a single author, not an anthology of maxims drawn from various sources, presented in verse form. The question of which apothegms actually originated with Sirach is open to debate, although scholars tend to regard him as a compiler or anthologist.

The teachings are applicable to all conditions of life: to parents and children, to husbands and wives, to the young, to masters, to friends, to the rich, and to the poor. Many of them are rules of courtesy and politeness; and a still greater number contain advice and instruction as to the duties of man toward himself and others, especially the poor, as well as toward society and the state, and most of all toward God.

Wisdom, in Ben Sira's view, is synonymous with the fear of God, and sometimes is identified in the text with adherence to the Mosaic law. The maxims are expressed in exact formulas, and are illustrated by striking images. They show a profound knowledge of the human heart, the disillusionment of experience, a fraternal sympathy with the poor and the oppressed.

By contrast some feel Sirach exhibits little compassion for either women or slaves. He advocates distrust and possessiveness over women, and the harsh treatment of slaves (which presupposes the validity of slavery as an institution), positions which are not only difficult for modern readers, but cannot be completely reconciled with the social milieu at the time of its composition.

The book contains the only instance in Biblical teaching of an explicit recommendation of physicians. This is a direct challenge against the traditional idea that illness and disease was seen as penalty for sin.

As in Ecclesiastes, two opposing tendencies war in the author: the faith and the morality of olden times, which are stronger than all argument, and an Epicureanism of modern date. Occasionally Sirach digresses to attack theories which he considers dangerous; for example, that man has no freedom of will, and that God is indifferent to the actions of mankind and does not reward virtue. Some of the refutations of these views are developed at considerable length.

Through these ethical chapters runs the prayer of Israel imploring God to gather together his scattered children, to bring to fulfilment the predictions of the Prophets, and to have mercy upon his Temple and his people. The book concludes with a justification of God, whose wisdom and greatness are said to be revealed in all God's works as well as in the history of Israel. These chapters are completed by the author's signature, and are followed by two hymns, the latter apparently a sort of alphabetical acrostic.

Of particular interest to biblical scholars are Chapters 44–50, in which Ben Sira praises "men of renown, and our fathers in their generation", starting from the antediluvian Enoch and continuing through to "Simon, the high priest, son of Onias" (300–270 BCE).  Within this recitation, Ben Sira identifies, either directly or indirectly, each of the books of the Old Testament that would eventually become canonical, with the apparent exception of only Ezra, Daniel, Ruth, Esther, and perhaps Chronicles. The ability to date the composition of Sirach within a few years given the autobiographical hints of Ben Sira and his grandson (author of the introduction to the work) provides great insight regarding the historical development and evolution of the Jewish canon.

Authorship and translation

Joshua ben Sirach, or, according to the Greek text "Jesus the son of Sirach of Jerusalem", was a Judahite scribe who had been living in Jerusalem, and may have authored the work in Alexandria, Egypt c. 180–175 BCE, where he is thought to have established a school. Ben Sirach is unique among all Old Testament and Apocryphal writers in that he signed his work.

The Prologue, attributed to Ben Sira's grandson and dated to 132 BCE, is generally considered the earliest witness to a canon of the books of the prophets. Thus the date of the text, has been the subject of intense scrutiny by biblical scholars.

Joshua ben Sirach's grandson was in Egypt, translating and editing after the usurping Hasmonean line had definitively ousted Simon's heirs in long struggles and was finally in control of the High Priesthood in Jerusalem. Comparing the Hebrew and Greek versions shows that he altered the prayer for Simon and broadened its application ("may He entrust to  his mercy"), in order to avoid closing a work praising God's covenanted faithfulness on an unanswered prayer.

The Greek translator states in his preface that he was the grandson of the author, and that he came to Egypt in the thirty-eighth year of the reign of "Euergetes". This epithet was borne by only two of the Ptolemies. Of these, Ptolemy III Euergetes reigned only twenty-five years (247–222 BCE) and thus Ptolemy VIII Euergetes must be intended; he ascended the throne in the year 170 BCE, together with his brother Ptolemy VI Philometor, but he soon became sole ruler of Cyrene, and from 146 to 117 BCE held sway over all Egypt. He dated his reign from the year in which he received the crown (i.e., from 170 BCE). The translator must therefore have gone to Egypt in 132 BCE.

The translation into Greek is believed to have been done after 117 BCE.

Language and alternative titles
The "Book of ben Sirach" was originally written in Hebrew, and was also known in Hebrew as the "Proverbs of ben Sirach" or the "Wisdom of ben Sirach". The book was not accepted into the Hebrew Bible and the original Hebrew text was not preserved in the Jewish canon. However, various original Hebrew versions have since been recovered, including fragments recovered within the Dead Sea Scrolls and the Cairo Genizah, the latter of which includes fragments from six separate manuscripts.

The Greek translation was accepted in the Septuagint under the (abbreviated) name of the author: . Some Greek manuscripts give as the title the "Wisdom of  Son of " or in short the "Wisdom of ". The older Latin versions were based on the Septuagint, and simply transliterated the Greek title in Latin letters: . In the Vulgate the book is called  ("Book of Joshua Son of Sirach").

The Greek Church Fathers also called it the "All-Virtuous Wisdom", while the Latin Church Fathers, beginning with Cyprian, termed it Ecclesiasticus because it was frequently read in churches, leading the early Latin Fathers to call it  (Latin and Latinised Greek for "church book"). Similarly, the Nova Vulgata and many modern English translations of the Apocrypha use the title Ecclesiasticus, literally "of the Church" because of its frequent use in Christian teaching and worship.

The Babylonian Talmud occasionally cites Ben-Sira (Sanhedrin 100b; Hagigah 13a, Baba Bathra 98b, etc.), but even so, it only paraphrases his citations, without quoting from him verbatim. This is shown by comparing fragmented texts of the original Hebrew "Book of Wisdom" (Ecclesiasticus) discovered in Qumran with the same quotes as given in the Babylonian Talmud.

Date and historical significance
Considering the average length of two generations, Sirach's date must fall in the first third of the 2nd century BCE. Furthermore, Sirach contains a eulogy of "Simon the High Priest, the son of Onias, who in his life repaired the House" (50:1). Festschrift M. Gilbert and other scholars posit that this seems to have formed the original ending of the text, and that Chapters 50 (from verse 2) and 51 are later interpolations. Under this theory, the second High Priest Simon (died 196 BCE) would have been intended, and the composition would have concluded shortly thereafter, given that struggles between Simon's successors (175–172 BCE) are not alluded to in the book, nor is the persecution of the Jews by Antiochus IV Epiphanes (168 BCE).

Manuscripts
The work of Sirach is presently known through various versions, which scholars still struggle to disentangle.

The Greek version of Sirach is found in many codices of the Septuagint.

As early as 1896, several substantial Hebrew texts of Sirach, copied in the 11th and 12th centuries, were found in the Cairo Geniza (a synagogue storage room for damaged manuscripts). Although none of these manuscripts is complete, together they provide the text for about two-thirds of the Wisdom of Sirach. According to scholars including Solomon Schechter and Frederic Kenyon, this shows that the book was originally written in Hebrew.

In the 1950s and 1960s various of portions of Sirach were found in Dead Sea-area excavations. Two such discoveries were among the Qumran scrolls, both fragmentary parchment scrolls from the Early Roman (Herodian) period (40 BCE – 70 CE): 2Q18 (2QSir) containing Sir 6:14–15, 20–31and 11Q5 (11QPsa) containing about one-fourth of the Masoratic psalms plus others, including one found in Sir 51. The largest and oldest scroll, Mas1H (MasSir), also a fragmentary parchment scroll but dated in the Late Hellenistic (Hasmonean) period (167–40 BCE) containing most of Sir 39:27–44:17, was discovered at Masada, the Jewish fortress destroyed by the Romans in 73 CE.  These early Hebrew texts are in substantial agreement with the Hebrew texts discovered in Cairo, although there are numerous minor textual variants. With these findings, scholars are now more confident that the Cairo texts are reliable witnesses to the Hebrew original.

Theological significance

Influence in Jewish doctrine and liturgy

Although excluded from the Jewish canon, Sirach was read and quoted as authoritative from the beginning of the rabbinic period. There are numerous citations to Sirach in the Talmud and works of rabbinic literature (as "", e.g., Hagigah 13a, Niddah 16b; Ber. 11b). Some of those (Sanhedrin 100b) record an unresolved debate between R'Joseph and Abaye as to whether it is forbidden to read the book of Sirach, wherein Abaye repeatedly draws parallels between statements in Sirach cited by R'Joseph as objectionable and similar statements appearing in canonical books.

Sirach may have been used as a basis for two important parts of the Jewish liturgy. In the Mahzor (High Holiday prayer book), a medieval Jewish poet may have used Sirach as the basis for a poem, in the Yom Kippur  ("additional") service for the High Holidays. Yosef Tabori questioned whether this passage in Sirach is referring at all to Yom Kippur, and thus argued it cannot form the basis of this poem. Some early 20th-century scholars also argued that the vocabulary and framework used by Sirach formed the basis of the most important of all Jewish prayers, the Amidah, but that conclusion is disputed as well.

Current scholarship takes a more conservative approach. On one hand, scholars find that "Ben Sira links Torah and wisdom with prayer in a manner that calls to mind the later views of the Rabbis", and that the Jewish liturgy echoes Sirach in the "use of hymns of praise, supplicatory prayers and benedictions, as well as the occurrence of [Biblical] words and phrases [that] take on special forms and meanings." However, they stop short of concluding a direct relationship existed; rather, what "seems likely is that the Rabbis ultimately borrowed extensively from the kinds of circles which produced Ben Sira and the Dead Sea Scrolls ...."

New Testament
Some scholars, such as Dr. Clayton N. Jefford, have argued that there are several allusions to the Wisdom of Sirach in the New Testament. These include the Virgin Mary's Magnificat in Luke 1:52 following Sirach 10:14; the description of the seed in Mark 4:5, 16–17 following Sirach 40:15; the statement by Jesus in Matthew 7:16, 20 following Sirach 27:6; and James 1:19 quoting Sirach 5:11.

The distinguished patristic scholar Henry Chadwick has said that in Matthew 11:28 Jesus was directly quoting Sirach 51:27, however, it appears that Chadwick cited these verses incorrectly because Jesus quotes Sirach 51:34 at Matthew 11:29. Additionally, compare Matthew 6:12 – "And forgive us our debts, as we forgive our debtors" – with Sirach 28:2; "Forgive your neighbor a wrong, and then, when you petition, your sins will be pardoned."

Messianic interpretation by Christians

Some Christians regard the catalogue of famous men in Sirach as containing several messianic references. The first occurs during the verses on David. Sirach 47:11 reads "The Lord took away his sins, and exalted his power for ever; he gave him the covenant of kings and a throne of glory in Israel." This references the covenant of 2 Samuel 7, which pointed toward the Messiah. "Power" (Hebrew ) is literally translated as 'horn'. This word is often used in a messianic and Davidic sense (e.g. Ezekiel 29:21, Psalms 132:17, Zechariah 6:12, Jeremiah 33:15). It is also used in the Benedictus to refer to Jesus ("and has raised up a horn of salvation for us in the house of his servant David").

Another verse (47:22) that Christians interpret messianically begins by again referencing 2 Samuel 7. This verse speaks of Solomon and goes on to say that David's line will continue forever. The verse ends stating that "he gave a remnant to Jacob, and to David a root of his stock." This references Isaiah's prophecy of the Messiah: "There shall come forth a shoot from the stump of Jesse, and a branch shall grow out of his roots"; and "In that day the root of Jesse shall stand as an ensign to the peoples; him shall the nations seek…" (Isaiah 11:1, 10).

References in Sirach and pre-modern texts
Note: verse numbers may vary slightly between versions.

 Aesop's fable of The Two Pots referenced at Sirach 13:2–3
 The Egyptian Satire of the Trades (written during the Middle Kingdom of Egypt, between 2025 and 1700 BCE), or another work in that tradition referenced at Sirach 38:24–39:11
The treatises of Zara Yaqob, Emperor of Ethiopia, on the nature and power of the Virgin Mary quotes Sirach 3:30, "Water extinguishes a burning fire and almsgiving atones for sin."
The Kebra Nagast chapter 88 quotes the Book of Sirach 15:16–17.
Bede quotes Ecclesiasticus 32:1 in the Lives of the Abbots of Wearmouth and Jarrow.
The third song O Tod, wie bitter bist du of Vier ernste Gesänge quotes Sirach 41:1–3.

References in culture

 The opening lines of Chariots of Fire, Best Picture at the 1982 Academy Awards, is from Sirach 44:1: "Let us now praise famous men, and our fathers that begat us."
 In "Canon Alberic's Scrap-Book", the first ghost story in his first published collection, M. R. James has his protagonist, Dennistoun, quote lines from Ecclesiasticus 39:28: "Some spirits there be that are created for vengeance, and in their fury lay on sore strokes."
 "Their name liveth for evermore" is a phrase from the King James Bible, forming the second half of a line in Sirach 44:14, widely inscribed on war memorials.
 The title of James Agee and Walker Evans's book Let Us Now Praise Famous Men is taken from Sirach 44:1.
 Ecclesiasticus 43:11–26 was recited at the 2021 funeral of Prince Philip by the Dean of Windsor.

See also
Roy Kinneer Patteson Jr.
David Kohn
Development of the Hebrew Bible canon
The road to hell is paved with good intentions

Notes

References

Sources
Askin, Lindsey A. (2018) Scribal Culture in Ben Sira E.J. Brill, Leiden 
Beentjes, Pancratius C. (1997) The Book of Ben Sira in Hebrew: A Text Edition of All Extant Hebrew Manuscripts and a Synopsis of All Parallel Hebrew Ben Sira Texts E.J. Brill, Leiden, 
Toy, Crawford Howell and Lévi, Israel (1906) "Sirach, The Wisdom of Jesus the Son of" entry in the Jewish Encyclopedia
Amidah, entry in (1972) Encyclopedia Judaica Jerusalem, Keter Publishing, Jerusalem,

External links

Sirach (Ecclesiasticus) – Latin Vulgate with Douay-Rheims version side-by-side
BenSira.org, original Hebrew manuscripts
"Ecclesiasticus" Catholic Encyclopedia
Sirach – Bibledex video overview
Sirach 2012 Translation with Audio
 The Wisdom of Jesus the Son of Sirach, Jewish Encyclopedia (1906 ed.).
 

2nd-century BC books
Deuterocanonical books
Essene texts
Ancient Hebrew texts
Wisdom literature
Jewish apocrypha
Jerusalem
Poetic Books